HOSMAT multispecialty Hospital Pvt. It also includes Hosmat Joint Replacement Center and HOSMAT Neurosciences. It is currently undergoing expansion to 500 beds, which would make it the largest speciality hospital of its kind in Asia.

Initially known as the 'accident hospital', later it was in the news as a centre for knee transplantation procedures. Now in its second decade, it was expanded in 2005 after the acquisition of an old ITI corporate office next door. Now it is India's largest orthopedic and neuro center.

Procedures carried out at the hospital include:
 Medical and surgical treatment of arthritis
 Joint replacements of the knee, hip, shoulder and elbow
 Fibre-optic arthroscopy of various joints
 Treatment of fractures, non-union and malunion of fractures, ligament injuries, reconstructive surgeries, specialized Ilizarov surgery (limb lengthening procedure)
 Correction of deformities
 Spinal surgeries (disc problems, spondylitis, pinched nerves, spine fractures, deformities, scholiosis and tumours)
 Paediatric orthopaedics
 Industrial injuries

In addition, the Neurosurgery and Neurology Department provides microsurgery, skull base, spine, trauma work, nerve injuries, surgery for brain and spinal cord tumours, slipped discs, paraplegia, hemiplegia, quadraplegia, migraine, muscular disorder, Parkinson's disease, Alzheimer's dementia, multiple sclerosis, and Guillain–Barré syndrome (GB syndrome).

Motto
The hospital's motto is "Medical Excellence with a Humane Touch".

Facilities
HOSMAT is a super major speciality hospital of 400 beds with 12 operation theatres in Bangalore, India.

References

External links
 

Hospitals in Bangalore
Year of establishment missing